In algebra, the Amitsur complex is a natural complex associated to a ring homomorphism. When the homomorphism is faithfully flat, the Amitsur complex is exact (thus determining a resolution), which is the basis of the theory of faithfully flat descent. 

The notion should be thought of as a mechanism to go beyond the conventional localization of rings and modules.

Definition 
Let  be a homomorphism of (not-necessary-commutative) rings. Define the face maps  by inserting 1 at the i-th spot:

Define the degeneracies  by multiplying out the i-th and (i + 1)-th spots:

They satisfy the "obvious" cosimplicial identities and thus  is a cosimplicial set. It then determines the complex with the augumentation , the Amitsur complex:

where

Exactness of the Amitsur complex

Faithfully flat case
In the above notations, if  is right faithfully flat, then a theorem of Alexander Grothendieck states that the (augmented) complex  is exact and thus is a resolution. More generally, if  is right faithfully flat, then, for each left R-module M,

is exact.

Proof:

Step 1: The statement is true if  splits as a ring homomorphism.

That " splits" is to say  for some homomorphism  ( is a retraction and  a section).

by

.
This is to say that h is a homotopy operator and so  determines the zero map on cohomology: i.e., the complex is exact.

Step 2: The statement is true in general.

Thus, Step 1 applied to the split ring homomorphism  implies:

where , is exact. Since , etc., by "faithfully flat", the original sequence is exact.

The case of the arc topology
 show that the Amitsur complex is exact if R and S are (commutative) perfect rings, and the map is required to be a covering in the arc topology (which is a weaker condition than being a cover in the flat topology).

Notes

References

Bibliography

 
 

Algebra